Ciulfina is a genus of small, tree-dwelling praying mantises belonging to the family Nanomantidae. They are native to Australia.

Species
The following species are recognised in the genus Ciulfina:
Ciulfina annecharlotteae
Ciulfina baldersoni
Ciulfina biseriata
Ciulfina herbersteinae
Ciulfina ianrichardi 
Ciulfina klassi
Ciulfina liturgusa
Ciulfina rentzi
Ciulfina terrymariceae

Description
Based upon the identification distinction of Ciulfina species through male genital morphology, an entomologist at Macquarie University suggests there may be more than fifteen Ciulfina species.

References

Mantodea genera
Nanomantidae
Mantodea of Oceania